Tonna may refer to:

Tonna, Neath, a village in Wales, part of the county borough Neath Port Talbot
Tonna RFC, a rugby union team from Tonna
Tonna (gastropod), a genus of marine snails
Tonna, Germany, a municipality in Thuringia, Germany
Tonna (Unstrut), a stream of Thuringia, Germany
An alternative spelling for the Japanese poet Ton'a
Tonna, Antenna, a French antenna manufacturer, renowned manufacturer of Amateur radio antennas

People with that name
Alfred Tonna (born 1950), Maltese former cyclist
Charlotte Elizabeth Tonna (1790–1846), popular Victorian English writer and novelist who wrote as Charlotte Elizabeth
Eivind Tonna (born 1975), Norwegian ski-orienteering competitor
Lewis Hippolytus Joseph Tonna (1812–1857), English polyglot and campaigner on behalf of evangelical protestantism

See also

Tonda (disambiguation)
Tonja (name)
Tonina (disambiguation)
Tonka (disambiguation)
Tonni (name)
Tonny (disambiguation)